Old Women is a 2003 Russian drama film directed by Gennady Sidorov.

Plot 
The film takes place in a village where several old women live. Suddenly a family of Uzbeks moved to the village and not everyone likes it.

Cast 
 Valentina Berezutskaya		
 Tamara Klimova
 Anastasia Lyubimova	
 Zoya Norkina
 Galina Smirnova
 Bronislava Zakharova

References

External links 
 

2003 films
2000s Russian-language films
Russian drama films
2003 drama films